Erika Wallner (2 September 1941 – 26 August 2016) was an Argentine actress.

Wallner died from kidney failure at Sanatorio de La Providencia in Buenos Aires, Argentina on 26 August 2016, one week before her 75th birthday.

Selected filmography
Forty Degrees in the Shade (1967) 
 Story of a Poor Young Man (1968)
 Bridge Over the Elbe (1969)

References

Bibliography
 Peter Cowie & Derek Elley. World Filmography: 1967. Fairleigh Dickinson University Press, 1977.

External links

1941 births
2016 deaths
Argentine television actresses
Argentine film actresses
Argentine stage actresses
People from Buenos Aires